Disrupted Ads is the seventh studio album by American hip hop producer and rapper Oh No. It was released on January 29, 2013. The album features guest appearances from Blu, MED, Rapsody, Psalm One, Tristate, Midaz, Chali 2na, Roc C, Gangrene, Declaime, Georgia Anne Muldrow and Souls of Mischief.

Track listing
All tracks produced by Oh No

References

External links
 

2013 albums
Oh No (musician) albums
Albums produced by Oh No (musician)